Jack "Jackie" Fennell (6 May 1933 – 3 January 2019) was an English professional rugby league footballer who played in the 1950s and 1960s.

Background
Jackie Fennell was born in Pontefract, West Riding of Yorkshire, England, he died aged 85, his funeral will take place at Pontefract Crematorium, Wakefield Road, Pontefract at 11:40am on Monday 28 January 2019, followed by a reception at the Featherstone Rovers RLFC.

Playing career

County Cup Final appearances
Jackie Fennell played  in Featherstone Rovers' 15–14 victory over Hull F.C. in the 1959–60 Yorkshire County Cup Final during the 1959–60 season at Headingley Rugby Stadium, Leeds on Saturday 31 October 1959, and played  in the 0–10 defeat by Halifax in the 1963–64 Yorkshire County Cup Final during the 1963–64 season at Belle Vue, Wakefield on Saturday 2 November 1963.

Club career
Jackie Fennell signed for Featherstone Rovers during December 1952, and made his début on Saturday 20 December 1952, he played in the Challenge Cup semi-final three times, losing on each occasion; the 1957–58 Challenge Cup during the 1957–58 season, 1959–60 Challenge Cup during the 1959–60 season, and the 1961–62 Challenge Cup during the 1961–62 season, he played his last match for Featherstone Rovers against Batley during April 1965, he appears to have scored no drop-goals (or field-goals as they are currently known in Australasia), but prior to the 1974–75 season all goals, whether; conversions, penalties, or drop-goals, scored 2-points, consequently prior to this date drop-goals were often not explicitly documented, therefore '0' drop-goals may indicate drop-goals not recorded, rather than no drop-goals scored.

Testimonial match
Jackie Fennell's benefit season/testimonial match at Featherstone Rovers took place during the 1962–63 season, including the match against Huddersfield at Post Office Road, Featherstone on Saturday 25 May 1963.

Honours
Featherstone Rovers
 Yorkshire Cup: 1959–60

Honoured at Featherstone Rovers
Jackie Fennell is a Featherstone Rovers Hall of Fame inductee.

Genealogical information
Jackie Fennell's marriage to Priscilla J. (née Bannister) was registered during second ¼ 1954 in Pontefract district. They had children; the future rugby league footballer; Dale Fennell.

References

External links

Search for "Fennell" at rugbyleagueproject.org
Jackie Fennell and Dale Fennell
Jackie Fennell
Why I would never have let my great friend take that final kick
Featherstone Rovers legends added to Hall of Fame
(archived by web.archive.org) Jackie Fennell at btinternet.com
Search for "Jack Fennell" at britishnewspaperarchive.co.uk
Search for "Jackie Fennell" at britishnewspaperarchive.co.uk

1933 births
2019 deaths
English rugby league players
Featherstone Rovers players
Rugby league centres
Rugby league five-eighths
Rugby league fullbacks
Rugby league players from Pontefract
Rugby league wingers